Maxim Alexandrovich Chudov (born 12 November 1982) is a former Russian biathlete.

Career
He debuted in the Biathlon World Cup in the 2004/05 season and has since been a regular member of the Russian team. He has won a total of seven medals at World Championships, three gold, three silver, and one bronze.

Graduated from the Law Faculty of the Bashkir State University.

Chudov retired from the sport after the IBU Cup in Obertilliach in the 2013–14 season.

Biathlon results
All results are sourced from the International Biathlon Union.

Olympic Games
1 medal (1 bronze)

World Championships
7 medals (3 gold, 3 silver, 1 bronze)

*During Olympic seasons competitions are only held for those events not included in the Olympic program.

Individual victories
4 victories (1 In, 2 Sp, 1 Pu)

*Results are from UIPMB and IBU races which include the Biathlon World Cup, Biathlon World Championships and the Winter Olympic Games.

References

External links
 

1982 births
Living people
People from Ufimsky District
Russian male biathletes
Biathletes at the 2006 Winter Olympics
Biathletes at the 2010 Winter Olympics
Olympic biathletes of Russia
Medalists at the 2010 Winter Olympics
Olympic medalists in biathlon
Olympic bronze medalists for Russia
Biathlon World Championships medalists
Bashkir State University alumni
Sportspeople from Bashkortostan
20th-century Russian people
21st-century Russian people